The Urviș is a right tributary of the river Beliu in Romania. It flows into the Beliu near the village Clit.

References

Rivers of Romania
Rivers of Arad County